Tina Bhatia is an Indian actress. She is best known for her role in Gulabo Sitabo, Gully Boy.

Acting career 
Bhatia made her debut with 2012 release . She also worked for two TV serial namely Pyar Ke Papad, “Kyunki Jeena Isi Ka Naam Hai” and “Zindgi dot com” for Doordarshan. She has also worked in English language film Interconnect In 2019, She played a notable role in Gully Boy. In 2020, She appeared in Gulabo Sitabo as a supporting role.
Some of her works are Sonata, BBG India, Servo OIL, Rudaali for Radio Mirchi, Symphony, Asian Paints

Filmography

Television

Awards and nominations 
Bhatia has received two international awards for her short film Inner City. She received Best Actress Award in Starlight Film Awards and Best Performance Female in Lake View International Film Festival. She was also awarded Best Actress at the Cult Critic Movie Award and L' Age d'Or International Arthouse Film Festival. Her film Oass won Best Film Award at Ladakh International Film Festival.

References

External links 

Indian film actresses
Living people
21st-century Indian actresses
Actresses from Indore
Actresses in Hindi cinema
Year of birth missing (living people)